Yohanan, Yochanan and Johanan are various transliterations to the Latin alphabet of the Hebrew male given name , a shortened form of , meaning "YHWH is gracious".

The name is ancient, recorded as the name of Johanan, high priest of the Second Temple around 400 BCE. It became the most popular Christian given name
in reference to either John the Apostle or John the Baptist.

Adaptations 

In the Latin Vulgate this was originally adopted as Iohannes (or Johannes – in Latin, J is the same letter as I).
The presence of an h, not found in the Greek adaptation, shows awareness of the Hebrew origin. Later editions of the Vulgate, such as the Clementine Vulgate, have Ioannes, however.

The anglicized form  John makes its appearance in Middle English, from the mid-12th century, as a direct adaptation from Medieval Latin Johannes,
the Old French being Jean.
The feminine form Joanna is also biblical, recorded in the form  as the name of
Joanna, wife of Chuza.

The form Johanan, even closer to the Hebrew original than Latin Johannes, is customarily used in English-language translations of the Hebrew Bible  (as opposed to John being used in English translations of the New Testament), in a tradition going back to Wycliffe's Bible, which uses John when translating from the Greek (e.g. of John the Baptist in Mark 1:4), but Johannan when translating from the Hebrew (as in Jeremiah 40:8).

People of that name

In the Old Testament (c. 7th – 1st century BCE) 

 Johanan, son of King Josiah of Judah (7th century BCE)
 Johanan, son of Kareah, mentioned as a leader of the army who led the remnant of the population of the Kingdom of Judah to Egypt for safety after the Babylonian dismantling of the kingdom in 586 BC and the subsequent assassination of Gedaliah, the Babylon-appointed Jewish governor.
 Johanan ben Joiada, a high priest mentioned in the Book of Nehemiah who is fourth in the line of high priests after Joshua the High Priest, who returned from the Babylonian captivity with Zerubbabel

 Johanan, Father of Mattathias
 John Gaddi, oldest of the sons of Mattathias, and brother of Judas Maccabeus, one of the leaders of the revolt of the Maccabees in the 2nd century BC.
 John Hyrcanus, Hasmonean (Maccabean) leader and Jewish high priest of the 2nd century BCE (born 164 BCE, reigned from 134 BCE until his death in 104 BCE).

Roman era (c. 1st century BC – 4th century AD) 

 John Hyrcanus II (1st century BCE), a member of the Hasmonean dynasty, High Priest, King, and ethnarch of Judea.
 John the Baptist (late 1st century BC – c. AD 30), a Jewish itinerant preacher and later Christian saint.
 John of Giscala, 1st century CE leader of the Jewish revolt against the Romans in the First Jewish-Roman War.
 Jehohanan, a man put to death by crucifixion in the 1st century CE, whose ossuary was found in 1968 in northern East Jerusalem
 John the Apostle, one of the Twelve Apostles of Jesus and possible author of the Johannine works.
 Other possible authors of the Johannine works: John the Evangelist, John of Patmos, John the Presbyter.

Rabbinic sages 

 Johanan ben Bag-Bag, one of the tannaim (rabbinic sages), who is mentioned several times in the Talmud.
 Johanan ben Baroka, second and third generation Jewish Tanna sage (2nd century).
 Johanan ben Torta, rabbi of the early 2nd century (third generation of tannaim).
 Johanan HaSandlar (c. 200–c. 300), one of the tannaim, whose teachings are quoted in the core text of Rabbinical Judaism, the Mishnah
 Johanan bar Nappaha (died c. 279), a rabbi in the early era of the Talmud, better known simply as "Rabbi Yohanan"
 Johanan ben Nuri, one of the tannaim of the 1st and 2nd centuries, frequently cited in the Mishnah
 Johanan ben Zakai (c. 30–90), one of the tannaim, widely regarded as one of the most important Jewish figures in the era of the Second Temple and a primary contributor to the Mishnah

Middle ages (4th century – 15th century) 

 Yohanan, ancestor of the Banu Qaynuqa.
 Johanan Luria, fifteenth century talmudist.

Modern period 

 Yochanan Afek (born 1952), Israeli chess player
 Yohanan Aharoni (1919–1976), Israeli archaeologist and historical geographer
 Yohanan Alemanno (c. 1435–after 1504), Italian Jewish humanist philosopher and exegete
 Yohanan Bader (1901–1994), Revisionist Zionist leader and Israeli politician
 Yohanan Cohen (1917–2013), Israeli former politician and diplomat
 Yohanan Danino (born 1959), chief of the Israel Police
 Yohanan Friedmann (born 1936), Israeli scholar of Islamic studies
 Yohanan Levi (1901–1945), Hebrew linguist and historian
 Yohanan Moyal (born 1965), Israeli Olympic gymnast
 Yochanan Muffs (1932–2009), American–Jewish professor of the Bible and religion
 Yohanan Petrovsky-Shtern (born 1962), American historian, philologist and essayist
 Yohanan Plesner (born 1972), Israeli politician
 Yohanan Simon (1905–1976), Israeli painter
 Yochanan Sofer (born 1923–2016), Rebbe (leader) of the Erlau Hasidic dynasty
 Yochanan Vollach (born 1945), Israeli former footballer and businessman

See also 

 Jose ben Jochanan, Nasi (president) of the Sanhedrin in the 2nd century BCE
 Yohannan

References 

Hebrew masculine given names
Theophoric names